Goedele Vermeiren (born 8 February 1962 in Mortsel) is a Belgian politician affiliated with the N-VA. She became a member of the Flemish Parliament in 2010, replacing Sophie De Wit who took up her position as member of the Belgian Chamber of Representatives.

Notes

Living people
Members of the Flemish Parliament
New Flemish Alliance politicians
1962 births
People from Mortsel
21st-century Belgian politicians
21st-century Belgian women politicians